The Liberia Girl Guides Association is the national Guiding organization of Liberia. It serves 9,000 members (as of 2022). Founded in 1926, the girls-only organization became a full member of the World Association of Girl Guides and Girl Scouts in 1928 and again in 1966 after a hiatus.

The Girl Guide emblem incorporates elements of the seal of Liberia.

See also
Boy Scouts of Liberia

References

World Association of Girl Guides and Girl Scouts member organizations
Scouting and Guiding in Liberia
Youth organizations established in 1920